Donald Matthew Grice (born July 29, 1981) is an American police officer and retired mixed martial artist. He was in the Ultimate Fighting Championship, fighting in the featherweight division before suffering a traumatic brain injury in a traffic accident in Shawnee, Oklahoma on September 8, 2013. Grice returned to his old job with the Oklahoma City Police Department in October 2014.

Wrestling
At Harrah High school, Grice was a 4-time Oklahoma State Wrestling Champion, winning Outstanding Wrestler 3 times, a feat which has never been accomplished by any other competitor. After his senior season, Grice was the most highly recruited wrestler in the nation at his weight. He chose the University of Oklahoma to attend college. The 2000-2001 season Grice was redshirted after suffering an elbow injury that required surgery, keeping him out of action for the season. Grice again was redshirted in the 2001-2002 season after a serious auto accident, during which he went through a windshield and required 12 surgeries. Grice graduated from Oklahoma with a bachelor's degree in sociology.

Mixed martial arts career

Early career
After graduating from college and giving up on his wrestling career, Grice decided to start in MMA. Grice started his professional career in 2005, winning nine straight fights between 2005 and 2007 before getting a call to compete in the UFC.

Ultimate Fighting Championship
Grice made his UFC debut at UFC 70 on April 21, 2007 against Terry Etim. The card took place in Manchester, England. Grice lost the fight via submission (guillotine choke) in the first round.

He had his second UFC outing at UFC 77 on October 20, 2007 against Jason Black. Grice won the fight via split decision. After his win over Black, Grice took two years to attend and graduate from the Oklahoma City Police Department Academy where he is currently an officer.

On February 7, 2009 Grice returned to fighting to fight Matt Veach at UFC Fight Night 17 in Tampa, Florida. Grice lost the fight via TKO in the first round.

Grice competed on the UFC's 100th PPV show, UFC 100, that took place July 11, 2009. He fought Shannon Gugerty and lost via first round submission. After a 1-3 record in the UFC, he was released from the promotion.

Return to the UFC
After going 4-0 outside the UFC, Grice dropped to featherweight in his return fight against Ricardo Lamas on June 26, 2011 at UFC on Versus 4. He lost via first round TKO to Lamas with a head kick and punches.

Grice was scheduled to face Josh Grispi on October 6, 2011 at UFC 136. However, Grispi was forced out of the bout with an injury and replaced by Nam Phan. Then Grice himself was forced out with an injury and replaced by Leonard Garcia.

Grice next faced Leonard Garcia on June 8, 2012 at UFC on FX 3, who he defeated via unanimous decision (30-27, 30-27, 30-27).

Grice faced Dennis Bermudez on February 23, 2013 at UFC 157. Grice lost to Bermudez by split decision. The back and forth action earned both fighters Fight of the Night honors and much praise from MMA observers.

Grice was expected to face Jeremy Larsen on October 19, 2013 at UFC 166.  However, Grice was forced out of the bout after sustaining serious injuries in a September 8 car accident in his home state of Oklahoma.

Championships & accomplishments
Ultimate Fighting Championship
Fight of the Night (Two times)

Personal life
Matt is married and has two daughters.

On April 4 Matt's home town, Harrah, Oklahoma, celebrates the annual Matt Grice Day.

Matt is active coaching today and is the head MMA coach at American Elite MMA in Edmond, Oklahoma.

Mixed martial arts record

|-
| Loss
|align=center| 15–5
| Dennis Bermudez
| Decision (split)
| UFC 157
| 
|align=center| 3
|align=center| 5:00
|Anaheim, California, United States
|
|-
| Win
|align=center| 15–4
| Leonard Garcia
| Decision (unanimous)
| UFC on FX: Johnson vs. McCall
| 
|align=center| 3
|align=center| 5:00
|Sunrise, Florida, United States
| 
|-
| Loss
|align=center| 14–4
| Ricardo Lamas
| TKO (head kick and punches)
| UFC Live: Kongo vs. Barry
| 
|align=center| 1
|align=center| 4:41
|Pittsburgh, Pennsylvania, United States
| 
|-
| Win
|align=center| 14–3
| David Gardner
| Decision (unanimous)
| FCF 46
| 
|align=center| 3
|align=center| 5:00
|Shawnee, Oklahoma, United States
| 
|-
| Win
|align=center| 13–3
| Thomas Schulte
| Submission (punches)
| FCF 44
| 
|align=center| 1
|align=center| 4:31
|Shawnee, Oklahoma, United States
| 
|-
| Win
|align=center| 12–3
| Rocky McAnally
| Submission (guillotine choke)
| FCF 43
| 
|align=center| 1
|align=center| 3:01
|Shawnee, Oklahoma, United States
| 
|-
| Win
|align=center| 11–3
| Steve Schneider
| Submission (punches)
| Bricktown Brawl 4
| 
|align=center| 1
|align=center| 1:40
|Oklahoma City, Oklahoma, United States
| 
|-
| Loss
|align=center| 10–3
| Shannon Gugerty
| Technical submission (guillotine choke)
| UFC 100
| 
|align=center| 1
|align=center| 2:36
|Las Vegas, Nevada, United States
| 
|-
| Loss
|align=center| 10–2
| Matt Veach
| TKO (punches)
| UFC Fight Night: Lauzon vs. Stephens
| 
|align=center| 1
|align=center| 4:34
|Tampa, Florida, United States
| 
|-
| Win
|align=center| 10–1
| Jason Black
| Decision (split)
| UFC 77
| 
|align=center| 3
|align=center| 5:00
|Columbus, Ohio, United States
| 
|-
| Loss
|align=center| 9–1
| Terry Etim
| Technical Submission (guillotine choke)
| UFC 70
| 
|align=center| 1
|align=center| 4:38
|Manchester, England
| 
|-
| Win
|align=center| 9–0
| Clint Kerley
| TKO (punches)
| Freestyle Cage Fighting
| 
|align=center| 1
|align=center| 1:08
|Shawnee, Oklahoma, United States
| 
|-
| Win
|align=center| 8–0
| Jason Anderson
| KO (head kick)
| Freestyle Cage Fighting
| 
|align=center| 1
|align=center| 0:15
|Shawnee, Oklahoma, United States
| 
|-
| Win
|align=center| 7–0
| Dan Marks
| Decision (unanimous)
| Extreme Wars 3: Bay Area Brawl
| 
|align=center| 3
|align=center| 5:00 
|Oakland, California, United States
| 
|-
| Win
|align=center| 6–0
| Lee King
| Submission
| Ultimate Texas Showdown 5
| 
|align=center| 1
|align=center| 1:46
|Dallas, Texas, United States
| 
|-
| Win
|align=center| 5–0
| Joe Davis
| TKO (punches)
| ACF: Showdown at Sundown
| 
|align=center| 1
|align=center| 0:49
|Stillwater, Oklahoma, United States
| 
|-
| Win
|align=center| 4–0
| Shervin Alavi
| Decision (unanimous)
| Ultimate Texas Showdown 4
| 
|align=center| 3
|align=center| 5:00 
|Dallas, Texas, United States
| 
|-
| Win
|align=center| 3–0
| Rocky Long
| TKO (punches)
| Ultimate Texas Showdown 3
| 
|align=center| 1
|align=center| 1:00
|Dallas, Texas, United States
| 
|-
| Win
|align=center|2–0
| Marco Adamballi
| KO (punch)
| XFC - Xtreme Fight Championship 4
| 
|align=center|1
|align=center|N/A
|Fort Smith, Arkansas, United States
|
|-
| Win
|align=center| 1–0
| Matt Grey
| KO (punch)
| EK: Extreme Fighting
| 
|align=center| 1
|align=center|1:21
|Norman, Oklahoma, United States
|

See also
 List of current UFC fighters
 List of male mixed martial artists

References

External links
Official UFC Profile
The Forge Brazilian Jiu Jitsu

American male mixed martial artists
Mixed martial artists from Oklahoma
Lightweight mixed martial artists
Mixed martial artists utilizing collegiate wrestling
Mixed martial artists utilizing Brazilian jiu-jitsu
Living people
1981 births
American practitioners of Brazilian jiu-jitsu
People from Midwest City, Oklahoma
Ultimate Fighting Championship male fighters